Industria can refer to:

 Industria (company), defunct Icelandic Internet deployment multinational
 Industria (settlement), lost Roman city on what is now Monteu da Po in Turin, Italy
 Industria (typeface), sans-serif typeface designed by Neville Brody in 1984
 Industria Incorporated, a manufacturer of industrial HVLS fans